The 8th Alpini Regiment is a regiment of the Italian Army's mountain infantry speciality, the Alpini, which distinguished itself in combat during World War I and World War II. As of 2022 the regiment is assigned to the Alpine Brigade "Julia" and based in the city of Venzone in Italy's northeast.

History

Formation 
The 8th Alpini Regiment was formed on 1 October 1909 in Udine with the Alpini battalions "Tolmezzo", "Gemona", which had been transferred from the 7th Alpini Regiment, and the newly raised Alpini Battalion "Cividale". The regiment's first commander was Colonel Antonio Cantore. As with all Alpini regiments the regiment's battalions were named for the location of their depot around which they recruited their troops. At the end of 1910 the regiment was structured as follows:

 8th Alpini Regiment, in Udine
  Alpini Battalion "Tolmezzo", in Tolmezzo
  6th Alpini Company
  12th Alpini Company
  72nd Alpini Company
  Alpini Battalion "Gemona", in Gemona
  69th Alpini Company
  70th Alpini Company
  71st Alpini Company
  Alpini Battalion "Cividale", in Cividale del Friuli
  16th Alpini Company
  20th Alpini Company
  76th Alpini Company

Italo-Turkish War 
In September 1912 the Tolmezzo was dispatched to Tripolitania to fight against the Ottoman Empire in the Italo-Turkish War. Together with the Alpini Battalion "Susa" from the 3rd Alpini Regiment, the Alpini Battalion "Vestone" from the 5th Alpini Regiment, and the Alpini Battalion "Feltre" from the 7th Alpini Regiment the Tolmezzo formed the 8th Special Alpini Regiment under command of Colonel Antonio Cantore. During its time in North Africa the Tolmezzo was awarded two Silver Medals of Military Valour for the its conduct at the Battle of Assaba and at the Battle of Ettangi. On 2 December 1913 the battalion returned to Italy.

World War I 

During World War I the regiment consisted of ten battalions and saw heavy fighting in the Alps regions of the Italian front against Austro-Hungarian and German forces. During the war the regiment consisted of the following battalions (pre-war battalions in bold, followed by their first and second line reserve battalions):

  Tolmezzo, Val Tagliamento, Monte Arvenis
  Gemona, Val Fella, Monte Canin
  Cividale, Val Natisone, Monte Matajur, Monte Nero

Initially the regiment was deployed in the Dolomites and then in the Carnic Alps. In spring 1915 the depot of the Gemona battalion formed the Alpini Volunteers Company "Gemona-Cividale", which was disbanded in March 1917 after suffering heavy losses. During the Battle of Caporetto in October 1917 and the following retreat to the Piave river the regiment suffered extreme losses and the battalions Gemona, Val Fella, Monte Canin, and Monte Nero had to be disbanded in November and December 1917. In February 1918 the battalions Val Tagliamento, Val Natisone, and Monte Matajur were disbanded to bring the regiment's remaining three battalions (Tolmezzo, Cividale, Monte Arvenis) back to full strength.

During the war 145 officers and 5,987 soldiers of the regiment were killed, and 294 officers and 8,099 soldiers were wounded. The regiment's battalions were awarded two Silver Medals of Military Valour, which were shared between the Gemona, Val Fella, and Monte Canin, respectively between the Tolmezzo and Val Tagliamento battalions. The Cividale and Val Natisone battalions were awarded a shared Bronze Medal of Military Valour.

Interwar years 
On 21 November 1919 the Alpini Battalion "Cividale" was transferred to the newly formed 9th Alpini Regiment. As replacement the Alpini Battalion "Verona" was transferred from the 6th Alpini Regiment. In 1926 both transfers were reversed. After World War I the 8th Alpini was assigned to the 3rd Alpine Division, which was reduced to III Alpine Brigade on 11 March 1926.

On 10 September 1935, the 3rd Alpine Division "Julia" was formed by renaming the III Superior Alpine Command "Julio", which was the their of the III Alpine Brigade.

World War II 

In mid-April 1939 the 3rd Alpine Division "Julia" was sent to Albania and posted to the Albanian-Yugoslav border until September 1941, when it was moved to the Greek border for the planned Italian invasion of Greece. During the following Greco-Italian war division suffered heavy casualties and only massive reinforcements allowed the Italians to hold the front in the Pindus mountains. These reinforcements included the 8th Alpini's  first line reserve battalions: Val Tagliamento, Val Fella, and Val Natisone, which had been formed after the outbreak of World War II.  The three battalions were assigned to the 1st Alpine Group "Valle" and sent to Albania as reinforcements for the Alpini units fighting there. After the German invasion of Greece and the Greek surrender the Julia returned to Italy. On the voyage home the ship Galilea carrying the Gemona was torpedoed and sunk by a British submarine on 28 March 1942: 21 officers and 630 soldiers drowned.

For its conduct during the Greco-Italian war the 8th Alpini Regiment was awarded Italy's highest military honor a Gold Medal of Military Valour.

In July 1942 the Julia was sent with the 2nd Alpine Division "Tridentina", 4th Alpine Division "Cuneense" and other Italian units to the Soviet Union to form the Italian Army in Russia ( abbreviated as ARMIR) and fight alongside the German Wehrmacht against the Red Army. Taking up positions along the Don River, the Italian units covered part of the left flank of the German Sixth Army, which spearheaded the German summer offensive of 1942 into the city of Stalingrad.

After successfully encircling the German Sixth army in Stalingrad the Red Army's attention turned to the Italian units along the Don. On 14 January 1943, the Soviet Operation Little Saturn began and the three alpine division found themselves quickly encircled by rapidly advancing armored Soviet Forces. The Alpini held the front on the Don, but within three days the Soviets had advanced 200 km to the left and right of the Alpini. On the evening of 17 January the commanding officer of the Italian Mountain Corps General Gabriele Nasci ordered a full retreat. At this point the Julia and Cuneense divisions were already heavily decimated and only the Tridentina was still capable of conducting combat operations. As the Soviets had already occupied every village bitter battles had to be fought to clear the way out of the encirclement. The remnants of the Tridentina were able to break the Soviet encirclement in the Battle of Nikolayevka on 26 January 1943, allowing the survivors of the Julia to reach German lines, which were reached on the morning of 28 January. By then the men of the 8th Alpini Regiment had walked 200 km, fought in 20 battles and spent 11 nights camped out in the middle of the Steppe. Temperatures during the nights were between -30 °C and -40 °C. For its conduct during the campaign in the Soviet Union the 8th Alpini Regiment was once more awarded Italy's highest military honor a Gold Medal of Military Valour.

The few survivors of the regiment were repatriated in spring 1943. After the announcement of the Armistice of Cassibile on 8 September 1943, the regiment and its battalions were disbanded by invading German forces.

Cold War 

After World War II the 8th Alpini Regiment was reformed on 1 April 1946, in the city of Padua with the battalions Feltre, Tolmezzo and L'Aquila. In May 1947 the regiment moved to Tolmezzo. On 20 August 1948 the regiment reformed the Alpini Battalion "Cividale". On 15 October 1949 the regiment entered the newly formed Alpine Brigade "Julia". On 1 June 1956 the Feltre was transferred to the 7th Alpini Regiment and as replacement the Gemona was reformed. On 26 October 1962 the regiment received the Alpini Battalion "Mondovì" from the 4th Alpini Regiment.

At the end of 1964 the regiment was the largest regiment of the Italian Army and consisted of the following units:

  8th Alpini Regiment, in Tolmezzo
  Command and Services Company, in Tolmezzo
  Alpini Battalion "Gemona", in Pontebba
  69th Alpini Company
  70th Alpini Company
  71st Alpini Company
  155th Mortar Company
  Alpini Battalion "Tolmezzo", in Venzone
  6th Alpini Company
  12th Alpini Company
  72nd Alpini Company
  114th Mortar Company
  Alpini Battalion "Cividale", in Chiusaforte
  16th Alpini Company
  20th Alpini Company
  76th Alpini Company
  115th Mortar Company
  Alpini Battalion "L'Aquila", in Tarvisio
  93rd Alpini Company
  108th Alpini Company
  143rd Alpini Company
  119th Mortar Company
  Alpini Battalion "Mondovì", in Paluzza
  9th Alpini Company
  10th Alpini Company
  11th Alpini Company
  103rd Mortar Company

During the 1975 army reform the army disbanded the regimental level and newly independent battalions were given for the first time their own flags. The changes to the 8th Alpini and its battalions were as follows:

 8th Alpini Regiment, in Tolmezzo
 Alpini Battalion "Tolmezzo", in Venzone - disbanded on 31 August 1975
 Alpini Battalion "Gemona", in Pontebba - disbanded on 31 August 1975
 Alpini Battalion "Cividale", in Chiusaforte - granted a new flag
 Alpini Battalion "L'Aquila", in Tarvisio - renamed Alpini Battalion "Gemona" on 1 September 1975
 Alpini Battalion "Mondovì", in Paluzza - renamed Alpini Battalion "Tolmezzo" on 1 September 1975 and granted a new flag

Additional changes to the infantry units of the Alpine brigade "Julia" were the following: the name and traditions of the Alpini Battalion "L'Aquila" were transferred to the Alpini Recruits Training Battalion "Julia" in L'Aquila, which was renamed and granted a new flag. On 1 September 1975 the Alpini Battalion "Vicenza" (Recruits Training) was activated in Tolmezzo and assigned the flag of the 9th Alpini Regiment. The reform concluded on 30 September 1975 when the 8th Alpini Regiment was disbanded and its flag and traditions assigned to the Gemona, the regiment's senior battalion.

After the end of the Cold War the 8th Alpini Regiment was reformed on 8 August 1992 in Tarvisio with the Gemona as its sole battalion.

Recent times 
On 1 November 1997 the regiment moved to Cividale del Friuli. On 14 October 2005 the 14th Alpini Regiment and its sole battalion, the Alpini Battalion "Tolmezzo", were disbanded. To keep the traditions of the other battalions of the regiment alive the Gemona was disbanded on 14 October 2006 and in its stead a new Alpini Battalion "Tolmezzo" was raised with companies from all the traditional battalions of the 8th Alpini:

 8th Alpini Regiment
 Command and Services Company
 Alpini Battalion "Tolmezzo"
 6th Alpini Company (Alpini Battalion "Tolmezzo")
 12th Alpini Company (Alpini Battalion "Tolmezzo")
 69th Alpini Company (Alpini Battalion "Gemona")
 115th Mortar Company (Alpini Battalion "Cividale")
 216th Support Weapons Company (Alpini Battalion "Val Natisone")

In 2011 the 216th was disbanded and its personnel integrated into the 69th Alpini Company.

Current structure 

The regiment is part of the Alpine Brigade "Julia" and based in the city of Venzone.

  Regimental Command
  Command and Logistic Support Company
  Alpini Battalion "Tolmezzo"
  6th Alpini Company "La Bella"
  12th Alpini Company "La Terribile"
  69th Alpini Company "La Fulmine"
  115th Maneuver Support Company "La Tormenta"

The Command and Logistic Support Company fields the following platoons: C3 Platoon, Transport and Materiel Platoon, Medical Platoon, and Commissariat Platoon.

Equipment 
The Alpini companies are equipped with Bv 206S tracked all-terrain carriers, Puma 6x6 wheeled armored personnel carriers and Lince light multirole vehicles. The maneuver support company is equipped with 120mm mortars and Spike MR anti-tank guided missiles.

Military honors 
After World War II the President of Italy awarded the 8th Alpini Regiment twice Italy's highest military honor, the Gold Medal of Military Valour, for the regiment's conduct and sacrifice during the Greco-Italian War and Italian campaign on the Eastern Front:

  Greco-Italian War, awarded 30 January 1948
  Italian campaign on the Eastern Front, awarded 31 December 1947

External links 
 Italian Army Website: 8° Reggimento Alpini
 8th Alpini Regiment on vecio.it

Sources 
 Franco dell'Uomo, Rodolfo Puletti: L'Esercito Italiano verso il 2000 - Volume Primo - Tomo I, Rome 1998, Stato Maggiore dell'Esercito - Ufficio Storico, pages: 489

References 

Alpini regiments of Italy
Regiments of Italy in World War I
Regiments of Italy in World War II
Military units and formations established in 1909
Military units and formations established in 1943
Military units and formations established in 1949